Forrest Beton Royal (February 10, 1893 – June 18, 1945) was a United States Navy rear admiral.

Biography
He was a member of the United States Naval Academy class of 1915. Service in increasingly important posts afloat and ashore prepared him for his role as commander of Amphibious Group 6 in the assaults on Leyte, Luzon, Mindanao, and Borneo during the Pacific War in 1944 and 1945. His planning and execution of these important assignments was recognized with the Distinguished Service Medal, and the posthumous (he had died of a heart attack on board his flagship ) award of a Gold Star in lieu of a second Distinguished Service Medal. He was also appointed posthumously Honorary Commander of the Order of the British Empire for his service for the allied cause.

Namesake
In 1946 the destroyer  was named after RADM Royal, sponsored by his daughter, Miss Katharine K. Royal.

References

(1946). "Launch 44th Destroyer." The New York Times. January 18.

External links 

Arlington National Cemetery

United States Navy admirals
United States Navy World War II admirals
Recipients of the Navy Distinguished Service Medal
Honorary Commanders of the Order of the British Empire
United States Naval Academy alumni
Military personnel from New York City
Burials at Arlington National Cemetery
1893 births
1945 deaths
United States Navy personnel killed in World War II